The Kathy Ireland Championship was a golf tournament on the LPGA Tour from 1999 to 2001. It was played at Onion Creek Club in Austin, Texas. Kathy Ireland was the title sponsor of the 2001 edition and all three editions were held in honor of Harvey Penick, an Austin native and World Golf Hall of Fame golf instructor.

Winners
Kathy Ireland Championship Honoring Harvey Penick
2001 Rosie Jones

The Philips Invitational Honoring Harvey Penick
2000 Laura Davies
1999 Akiko Fukushima

References

Former LPGA Tour events
Golf in Texas
Sports in Austin, Texas
Recurring sporting events established in 1999
Recurring sporting events disestablished in 2001
1999 establishments in Texas
2001 disestablishments in Texas
Women's sports in Texas